Kim Chun-hwa (born 14 July 1974) is a former North Korean female short track speed skater. She was one of twenty North Korean athletes at the 1992 Winter Olympics in Albertville, France, where she competed in the 500m short track speed skating event. She finished in 19th place, behind another of her teammates, bronze medalist Hwang Ok-sil.

She also competed in the 1991 Winter Universiade in Sapporo, Japan. There, she earned a gold medal in the 1500m short track, and a bronze medal in the 3000m, giving North Korea two of its seven medals. In the 1993 Winter Universiade in Zakopane, Poland she won a silver medal in the 500m, one of the best results by a North Korean at that event.

Kim is a graduate of the Sosong district extramural sports school in Pyongyang.

References 

1974 births
Living people
North Korean female short track speed skaters
Olympic short track speed skaters of North Korea
Short track speed skaters at the 1992 Winter Olympics
People from Haeju
Universiade silver medalists for North Korea
Universiade medalists in short track speed skating
Competitors at the 1991 Winter Universiade
Competitors at the 1993 Winter Universiade
20th-century North Korean women